David Henry Crone (2 May 1893 – 2 November 1959) was an Australian rules footballer who played with Fitzroy and Carlton in the Victorian Football League (VFL).

Notes

External links 

Dave Crone's profile at Blueseum

1893 births
1959 deaths
Australian rules footballers from Victoria (Australia)
Australian Rules footballers: place kick exponents
Fitzroy Football Club players
Carlton Football Club players
South Ballarat Football Club players
Australian military personnel of World War I